Let the Rhythm Hit ’Em is the third studio album by hip hop duo Eric B. & Rakim, released on June 19, 1990. The group's sound develops further, with Rakim adopting a deeper, more aggressive tone of voice, and more mature and serious subject matter. Musically, the production ranges from smoother soulful tracks such as "In the Ghetto" to the hard-edged assault of the title track "Let the Rhythm Hit ’Em."

The back cover features a dedication to the memories of Rakim's father William and producer Paul C., who had worked on many of the album's tracks before his murder in July 1989. Paul's protégé, Large Professor, completed his work; however, neither receive credit in the album's notes.

Production credits
Much like past Eric B. & Rakim albums, production was credited to the duo. For this album however, production was supposed to be handled by Producer Paul C. Because of his murder in 1989, his protégé, Large Professor (still an unknown beatmaker from Queens who was still in high school) was called upon to complete the album's beats. Large Professor confirmed that Paul produced the songs "Run for Cover" and "Untouchables" in full. Regarding his contributions, Large Professor confirmed that he did all of "In the Ghetto" (based around a sample Paul had given him) and "Step Back" as well as the drum programming for "No Omega" and co-production on the title track. The rest of the production is assumed to have been handled by Rakim, his brother Stevie Blass Griffin and the album engineer, Patrick Adams. Rakim confirmed that Paul C. also produced "Keep 'Em Eager to Listen" and "Set 'Em Straight". Rakim produced "No Omega" based on a sample that Paul had given him. The bonus track on the CD version, a remix of the title track, was produced by DJ Mark the 45 King, who had previously done some beats for Eric B. & Rakim's second album, Follow the Leader. Because of his involvement in the production, Large Professor was chosen by Eric B as a ghost producer for Kool G Rap & DJ Polo's second album, Wanted: Dead or Alive.

Singles
Three singles were released from the album. The first single "Let the Rhythm Hit Em" charted at #23 and #2 on the Hot R&B/Hip-Hop Songs and Hot Rap Songs, making it the most successful single of the three. The second single "In the Ghetto" charted at #82 and #10 on the Hot R&B/Hip-Hop Songs and Hot Rap Songs. The third and final single "Mahogany" did not chart on the Hot R&B/Hip-Hop Songs, but it charted on the Hot Rap Songs at #28.

Critical reception
Let the Rhythm Hit 'Em received positive to mixed reviews from critics.
Despite the fact that it did not produce any hit singles as popular as the duo's previous albums, it is considered by many to be their most coherent album, and is one of only a few rap albums that have received a 5-mic rating when it was reviewed in The Source. In 1998, the album was selected as one of The Source's 100 Best Rap Albums.

Track listing

Personnel
Credits for Follow the Leader adapted from AllMusic.

DJ Mark the 45 King - Remixing
Tony A. - Engineer
Patrick Adams - Engineer
Carlton Batts - Mastering
Kevin Crouse - Assistant Engineer
Eric Barrier - Primary Artist, Producer, Composer
Carol Friedman - Art Direction
P. Tony - Engineer
Anton Pukshansky - Engineer
William Griffin - Primary Artist, Producer, Composer
Patrick Roques - Design
Brian Scheuble - Engineer
Ralph Sutton - Engineer
Randy Wine - Assistant Engineer

In popular culture
The first single and title track "Let the Rhythm Hit Em'" appeared in the 2007 football video game All-Pro Football 2K8.

Charts

Weekly charts

Year-end charts

Certifications

References

1990 albums
Eric B. & Rakim albums
Albums produced by Eric B.
Albums produced by Large Professor
Albums produced by the 45 King